Cornish Pirates Rugby Club is a Cornish professional rugby union club playing in the second tier of the English rugby union system, the RFU Championship. The club was formed in 1945 when Penzance RFC and Newlyn RFC amalgamated to form Penzance & Newlyn RFC and is based in Penzance, Cornwall. Twenty days after the end of the Second World War, the first match was played against Guy's Hospital on 22 September 1945. The club was renamed Cornish Pirates in 2005 and apart from one season at Kenwyn, Truro and four at the Recreation Ground, Camborne, they play at the Mennaye Field in Penzance.

The list below details the club's achievements from the first league season when they played at level eight in the Cornwall and Devon League through to  last season (2011–12), when they equalled their highest league position and were also losing finalists in the play–off for promotion to the Aviva Premiership. The club have won promotion on six occasions and have been successful twice in national competitions and also won Cornish Cup competitions three times.

[1]Semi-final held and won at beginning of following season; the final against Launceston was not played and the Pirates decided to withdraw from Cornwall RFU competitions for seven seasons.
[2]three points deducted for scrum replacement irregularity
[3]New competition, the Cornwall Super Cup
[4]British and Irish Cup from 2009–10 onwards

See also

Cornish Pirates
RFU Championship

References

External links
Cornish Pirates official website

 
Cornwall-related lists